Prince Ekow Freeman is a Ghanaian actor, known for movies such as I Sing of a Well and Rhapsody Of Love.

Career 
Ekow has starred in a number of movies. He used to be the chairman of the Project Committee of Felvic Aviation Events and the Former Assistant District Grand Director for the District Grand Lodge of Cape Coast.

Filmography 

 Rhapsody Of Love (2010)
 Hot Fork (2010)
 I Sing of a Well (2009)
 Welcome Home (2004)
 Beyonce 2: The President's Daughter (2006)
 Force Marriage

References 

Living people
Ghanaian male film actors
Year of birth missing (living people)